The 1998 Big Ten softball tournament was held at Alumni Field on the campus of the University of Michigan in Ann Arbor, Michigan.  As the tournament winner, Michigan earned the Big Ten Conference's automatic bid to the 1998 NCAA Division I softball tournament. This was the last of four consecutive Big Ten softball tournaments that Michigan would win from 1995–1998.

Format and seeding
The 1998 tournament was a four team double-elimination tournament. The top four teams based on conference regular season winning percentage earned invites to the tournament.

Tournament

References

Big Ten softball tournament
Tournament
Big Ten softball tournament